Villers-sur-Mer is the railway station for the town of Villers-sur-Mer. The station is built in Ouest architecture and is on the Côte Fleurie branchline from Trouville-Deauville and to Dives-Cabourg.

The line from Trouville-Deauville to Villers-sur-Mer and Houlgate opened in 1884. The station building was in use until 1996, but is now only used as a stop by regional trains and tickets must be bought on-board trains. The trains between Trouville-Deauville and Dives-Cabourg only run in summer.

References

External links
Station information (French language)

Railway stations in France opened in 1884
Railway stations in Calvados